Love Speaks (Chinese: 意外的恋爱时光) is a 2013 Chinese romance film directed by Li Zhi and starring Jaycee Chan and Amber Kuo.

Cast
 Jaycee Chan as Zhou Tong
 Amber Kuo as Wang Leqing
 Archie Kao as Shao Dong

References

External links

Chinese romance films
2013 romance films
2013 films